The 2015–16 season of the Swiss 1. Liga was the 94th season of the fourth tier of the Swiss football league system.

Tables

Group 1

Group 2

Group 3

Promotion play-offs

FC Bavois and FC La Chaux-de-Fonds were promoted to the 2016–17 1. Liga Promotion.

Following FC Biel-Bienne's bankruptcy and expulsion from the Swiss Challenge League a third promotion spot was available, to be decided by a single match between the losers of the two Play-off Finals.

|}

FC United Zürich were promoted to the 2016–17 1. Liga Promotion.

References

External links 
  

Swiss 1. Liga Classic
4